Ronnie G. Barrett (born 1954) is the founder of Barrett Firearms Manufacturing of Christiana, Tennessee, board member of the National Rifle Association, and the designer of the Barrett M82.

Life and career 

Barrett was born in Murfreesboro, Tennessee in 1954, and graduated from Murfreesboro Central High School.
He started his career in 1972 as a professional photographer for a studio in the same town. In 1982, while he owned a photography studio, he got his initial inspiration to create the Barrett M82. On January 1, 1982, when Barrett was photographing a river patrol gunboat on the Stones River near Nashville, Tennessee, a picture he shot of the twin Browning machine guns mounted prominently on the boat made him think of the .50 BMG cartridge and its potential for commercial users.

With no engineering background, Barrett hand-sketched plans at home for a .50BMG repeating semi-automatic rifle. Later, he found a partner in tool and die maker Bob Mitchell and an employee at a sheet metal fabricator in Smyrna, Tennessee. Four months later a first prototype was finished. A second prototype shown off at a gun show in Houston would grant Barrett the starting capital from three investors, necessary to start the Barrett Firearms Manufacturing company and initial production of 30 rifles for private use. Large-scale commercial success came when the CIA acquired an unknown number of rifles for arming the Afghan mujahideen as part of the Soviet–Afghan War effort. In 1989, the Swedish Army adopted the M82 as a sniper rifle. In 1990, the United States Armed Forces followed, and subsequently deployed the rifles during Operation Desert storm.

Barrett is an advocate for the private ownership of firearms. Barrett has headed fundraising campaigns for the National Rifle Association, sits on its board of directors, and makes occasional appearances for Cam & Company where he speaks on gun laws.

Barrett married former Tennessee State Rep. Donna Rowland in 2010.

References

External links 
Barrett Firearms Official Website

1954 births
Firearm designers
Living people
Barrett Firearms Manufacturing
People from Murfreesboro, Tennessee